The Scropton Tramway was a British industrial  narrow gauge railway connecting several gypsum mines with the North Staffordshire Railway station at Scropton in Staffordshire. It was also used to transport munitions during World War II.

Locomotives

See also

 British industrial narrow gauge railways

References 

 

3 ft gauge railways in England
Industrial railways in England
Gypsum mines in England
Rail transport in Staffordshire